The Diocese of Nitra is a Roman Catholic diocese western Slovakia, with its seat in Nitra. , the bishop is Viliam Judák.

History 
The diocese was created as the first one on the territory of present-day Slovakia around 880 (from the Diocese of Regensburg), during the time of Great Moravia. Its first bishop was the Saint Methodius. Its destiny after the fall of Great Moravia isn't known. It was re-established in 1105 as part of the ecclesiastical province of Esztergom in the Kingdom of Hungary. In 1977, it was taken from the Archdiocese of Esztergom and attached into the newly established Diocese of Trnava. Before the reorganization in 2008, it was situated in the western parts of the Trenčín and Žilina regions (basically the former Trencsén County) with a strip connecting it to the city of Nitra. It had an area of 5,321 km² and a population of that area was 838,861 of which around 84% were of Catholic faith (2004).

On 14 February 2008, the territory of the diocese was reorganized. The diocese lost northern parts to the newly created Diocese of Žilina, but gained territory around the "strip" and southern parts from the Archdiocese of Bratislava-Trnava.

Bishops through 1892

 
	Saint Methodius of Thessaloniki
	Wiching (880—891)
	Anonymus (900—906) (?)
	Svätý Bystrík (?1005—1046)
	Gerváz (1106)
	I. Miklós (1133)
	Pál (Savol) (1137)
	I. János (1156)
	I. Tamás (1165)
	Edvárd (1168—1198)
	II. János (1204)
	I. Vince (1220—1222)
	I. Jakab (1223—1240)
	I. Ádám (1241)
	Bartolomäus (1242—1243)
	II. Ádám  (1244—1252)
	II. Miklós (1253—1255)
	II. Vince (1255—1272)
	I. Fülöp (1272)
	I. Péter (1279—1281)
	Pascház (1281—1297)
	III. János (1302—1328)
	Mieszko of Bytom (1328—1334)
	Vasvári Vid (Vitus de Castroferreo) (1334—1347)
	III. Miklós Vásári (1347—1348)
	Nicholas Apáti (1349)
	I. István de Insula (Szigeti) (1350—1367)
	I. László de Demjen (Demjéni) (1368—1372)
	Domonkos de Novoloco (Újhelyi) (1373—1384)
	I. Dömötör (1387—1388)
	I. Gergely (1388—1392)
	II. Mihály de Hédervári (1393—1399)
	II. Péter Poliak (Polonus) (1399—1403)
	Hinco (14041427)
	I. György Berzeviczy (1429—1437)
	Dénes Szécsi de Felsőlendva  (1438—1439)
	II. László Csetneki (1440—1447)
	IV. Miklós (1448—1456)
	Albert Hangács Vétesi (1458—1459)
	Illés (1460—1463)
	II. Tamás Debrenthei (1463—1480)
	II. Gergely (1484—1492)
	I. Antal Sánkfalvi (1492—1500)
	V. Miklós Bácskai (1501—1503)
Zsigmond Thurzó (4. August 1503-15. November 1504)
II. István Podmanický (1505-1530)   
I. Ferenc Thuróo (1534-1557)   
Pál Abstemius-Bornemissza (1557-1579)
Zakariás Mossóczy (1582-1587)   
III. István Fejérkövy (1587-1596)   
Ferenc Forgách (1596-1607)
István Szuhay (1607- † 9. jún 1608) 
Bálint Lépes (1608-1619)   
János Telegdy (1619-1624)  
V. István Bosnyák (1644)     
V. János Püsky (1645-1648)
II. György Szelepcsényi (1648-1666)
Leopold Karl von Kollonitsch (1666-1669)   
III. Tamás Pálffy (1669-1679)   
János Gubasóczy (1679-1685)  
III. Péter Korompay (1686-1690)   
II. Jakab Haskó (1690-1691)
I. Balázs Jáklin (1691-1695)   
III. László Mattyasovszky (1696-1705)
IV. Count László Ádám Erdödi de Monyorókerék (1706-1736)
János Ernő Harrach (1738-1739)
I. Count Imre Gábor Esterházy de Galántha (1740-1763)   
János Gusztínyi-Zubralovszky (1. januáry 1764- † 31. januáry 1777)
Antal Révai (1780-1783)   
Ferenc Xavér Fuchs (1787-1804)   
József Kluch (1808-1826)
József Vurum (1827-1838)   
Imre Palugyay (1838 † 27. júl 1858)
Ágoston Roskoványi (1859-1892)

Recent bishops

Imre Bende

Bishop Imre Bende (born 28 August 1824, Baja, Hungary – died March 26, 1911, Nitra) was a religious writer and Roman Catholic Bishop of Banská Bystrica in 1887, then Bishop  of Nitra in 1893. He studied theology at the University of Vienna and in 1847 in Kalocsa ordained a priest. In 1869 he became a priest in Novi Sad. Between 1878 and 1884 he was elected official in the Hungarian Parliament, for the Hungarian Liberal Party.

Vilmos Batthyány 

Viliam Batan or Vilmos Batthyány (full name Hung. Vilmos Németújvár Count Batthyány Mary Tivadar Gobert) (born March 14, 1870, Zalaszentgrót, Hungary today – died November 24, 1923, Körmend, Hungary)

Born into the Batthyány, noble family of Hungary, the son of Count Batthyány de Németújvár and Countess Sigismund Erdődy.

He studied philosophy and theology at the University of Innsbruck and Rome and received a doctorate in canon law. He was ordained priest in 1894 and was connon of Nitra, Auxiliary Bishop of Nitra (1904); in 1911 he became Bishop of Nitra.

After the establishment of Czechoslovakia in 1918 Hungarian Church hierarchy were perceived as a threat to national interests of the new republic and demanded to resign. Batan as a lawyer, tried to oppose the demands, however he was unsuccessful and several Hungarian prelates were escorted to the bridge over the Danube in Esztergom. Batan left shortly after.

Karol Kmeťko
Karol Kmeťko (born December 12, 1875, Lower Držkovce – died December 22, 1948, Nitra) was a Roman Catholic cleric, Bishop of Nitra, and the author of religious books and articles.

Karol Kmeťko was one of the signatories of the Martin Declaration of 30 October 1918. From 1918 to 1920 he was a member of the Revolutionary National Assembly, in 1920 he became a Member of the National Assembly. On its mandate, he resigned in 1922 after assuming the functions of a bishop.

After the collapse of the Austro-Hungarian Empire and the creation of Czechoslovakia, the Nitra bishop (Viliam Batan) was expelled from Czechoslovakia. Pope Benedict XV secretly appointed Karol Kmeťko the Bishop of Nitra on December 16, 1920. On May 11, 1944, Pope Pius XII appointed him Archbishop ad personam.

Eduard Nécsey
Dr. Eduard Nécsey (born 9 February 1892, Oslany – died June 19, 1968, Nitra) was a Roman Catholic cleric, Titular Archbishop and Apostolic Administrator of the diocese of Nitra. Studied and ordained at Innsbruck In 1943 he was appointed Auxiliary Bishop of the Diocese of Nitra and was consecrated in Nitra on May 16, 1943. He defended his appointment to the communist regime and latter attended Vatican II; he died in Nitra in 1968.

Ján Pásztor
Ján Pásztor (born 27 January 1912, Prievidza – died 8 November 1988)  Educated in his native Prievidza. He studied theology in Nitra seminary and at the Charles University. Ordination in 1934 at Nitra parish and further studytill WW2. A doctorate in theology at Charles University (1937) Law at University of Bratislava (1942). He became a priest in Dubnica in 1947 and 
In 1950 he was interned in a camp at Močenku and in 1953 imprisoned. After his release he worked as a parish administrator till 1961 and as till 1967. Pope Paul VI appointed him consultor of the Roman Commission for the revision of the Church's Code (1968), and he later became the capitular vicar.
In the 1960s he negotiated between the Czech government and the Vatican, and in 1973 he was appointed Bishop of Nitra.

Ján Chryzostom Korec

Ján Chryzostom Korec; born January 22, 1924; died  October 24, 2015.
He was ordained in 1950, and named a bishop in 1951 (at 27, and was consecrated clandestinely). On 6 February 1990, he was appointed Bishop of Nitra (Cardinal in 1991); retired 9 June 2005.

Viliam Judák
Viliam Judák is the current bishop.

References

External links 
 Diocese of Nitra at catholic-hierarchy.org
 Diocese of Nitra on the Catholic Encyclopedia at newadvent.org

Roman Catholic dioceses in Slovakia
Catholic Church in Slovakia
Nitra